EuroBasket 2017 was the 40th edition of the EuroBasket championship that was organized by FIBA Europe and held between 31 August and 17 September 2017. Beginning from 2017, the continental championships take place every four years with a similar system of qualification as for the FIBA Basketball World Cup.

Like the previous edition, the tournament was co-hosted by four countries. Games in the group stage were held in Turkey, Finland, Israel and Romania. The knock-out phase was played in Istanbul, Turkey.

Slovenia won their first-ever tournament after defeating Serbia 93–85 in the final. Spain won the bronze medal by beating Russia with the same result.

Host selection

Following the decision to relocate the 2015 tournament, original hosts Ukraine were offered the chance to host the 2017 edition, but they declined, citing the ongoing unrest in the country. Countries expressed interest in hosting were Lithuania, Latvia, Estonia and Finland (possible joint bid), Serbia, Macedonia, and Bulgaria (possible joint bid), United Kingdom, Israel, Poland, Slovenia, Belgium.

On 5 November 2015, FIBA Europe announced that five national federations have applied to organise the EuroBasket 2017: Finland, Israel, Poland, Romania and Turkey.

On 11 December 2015, FIBA Europe announced that the tournament will be hosted by four countries: Israel, Romania, Finland and Turkey with the knockout stage host at the Sinan Erdem Dome in Istanbul.

Venues

Format
A total of 24 qualified teams played in groups of six; the four best teams in these groups advanced to a single-elimination knockout stage.

Qualification

The hosts (4 teams) and 2016 Summer Olympics or 2016 Olympic Qualifying Tournament participants (9 other teams) all qualified directly to the EuroBasket 2017.

The remaining 27 teams joined through qualification from 31 August 2016 to 17 September 2016 for 11 places.

Draw
The draw took place in Turkey on 22 November 2016.

Seedings
FIBA Europe released the seedings for the EuroBasket 2017 draw on 20 November 2016. According to the FIBA Europe regulations the participating nations, the 9 participants of the 2016 Summer Olympics and Olympic Qualifying Tournaments would be seeded first, based on their respective records in EuroBasket 2015, with the remaining teams seeded based on their qualification records.

As in the EuroBasket 2015, each of the four hosts was granted the right to select a partner federation for commercial and marketing criteria. These teams would automatically be placed into the same group as their chosen partner country.

Final draw

 Finland was paired with Iceland before the draw.
 Israel was paired with Lithuania before the draw.
 Romania was paired with Hungary before the draw.
 Turkey was paired with Russia before the draw.
 Before the draw it was already certain that Croatia would end up in the group with Hungary and Romania, due to the assignments of Finland, Israel and Turkey in their pot.

Squads

Preliminary round
Similar to EuroBasket 2015 the preliminary round is being played in four different venues in different countries. Each of the four groups exists of six teams, the best four teams of each group advance to the knockout stage. The first matches were played on August 31 and the last are scheduled for September 7.

Group A

Venue: Helsinki, Finland

Group B
Venue: Tel Aviv, Israel

Group C
Venue: Cluj-Napoca, Romania

Group D
Venue: Istanbul, Turkey

Knockout stage
Venue: Istanbul, Turkey

Final

Final standings
The final standings per FIBA official website:

Statistics and awards

Statistical leaders

Points

Rebounds

Assists

Blocks

Steals

Awards

All Tournament Team
 Goran Dragić
 Alexey Shved
 Bogdan Bogdanović
 Luka Dončić
 Pau Gasol

FIBA broadcasting rights

Medal team rosters

References

External links

Official website

 
 

2017
2017–18 in European basketball
August 2017 sports events in Asia
August 2017 sports events in Europe
September 2017 sports events in Asia
September 2017 sports events in Europe
International basketball competitions hosted by Israel
International basketball competitions hosted by Finland
International basketball competitions hosted by Romania
International basketball competitions hosted by Turkey
2017 in Israeli sport
2017 in Finnish sport
2017 in Romanian sport
2017 in Turkish sport
Sport in Cluj-Napoca
Basketball, 2017 EuroBasket
International sports competitions in Helsinki
Sports competitions in Istanbul